Steve Anderson is an American film director, writer, and producer. After graduating with an undergraduate degree from Nazareth College in Rochester, New York, he gained experience as a television cameraman. He made documentary films for PBS, and won a Peabody Award for Safe Haven in 1987. He moved to Los Angeles, California in 1989 and worked for CNN.

Anderson made his feature film directorial debut in 2003 with The Big Empty starring Daryl Hannah and Jon Favreau. He directed the documentary film Fuck, which features commentary by a variety of individuals, including Kevin Smith, Steven Bochco, Janeane Garofalo, Bill Maher, Drew Carey, and Alanis Morissette.

Early life and education
Anderson was raised in Pittsford, New York. He received an undergraduate degree from Nazareth College in Rochester, New York. He worked as a cameraman for WXXI-TV.

Career
Steve Anderson gained experience in filmmaking while directing documentary films for PBS. One of these productions for PBS titled Safe Haven earned him recognition with a Peabody Award in 1987. In 1989, Anderson moved to Los Angeles, California. He worked for CNN in California.

Anderson made his feature film directorial debut in 2003 with the film The Big Empty.

He directed the documentary film Fuck, which features commentary by a variety of celebrities.

Filmography

Awards

See also
Carla Ulbrich
List of science fiction films of the 2000s
Rainstorm Entertainment
ThinkFilm

References

External links

Living people
American film directors
American male screenwriters
American film producers
Year of birth missing (living people)
Place of birth missing (living people)